Poojai is a 2014 Indian Tamil-language action film written and directed by Hari, and produced by Vishal, who also played the lead role alongside an ensemble cast featuring Shruti Haasan, Sathyaraj, Raadhika, Mukesh Tiwari, and Soori. Yuvan Shankar Raja composed the soundtrack and score for the film, while cinematography and editing were handled by Priyan and V. T. Vijayan, respectively.

The film was officially launched on 28 March 2014 with a first look release, and principal photography began on 18 April 2014. The film released on 22 October 2014 on the occasion of Diwali. and received mixed reviews from critics. It was remade in Kannada as Anjani Putra starring Puneeth Rajkumar.

Plot
Vasudevan "Vasu" is a Coimbatore-based moneylender and the heir to the Kovai Group, a cloth manufacturing company, until he was disowned by his mother and matriarch of his joint family Rajalakshmi due to some misunderstanding. He meets a rich girl named Divya at a mall and become friends. However, Divya rejects his proposal due to status-issues, but later falls for his humble nature. One day, Vasu saves the ASP of Coimbatore District Sivakkozhundhu and his wife from a group of thugs who work for Anna Thandavam, a Pollachi-based businessman and hitman who frequently hires the North Indian killers to kill anyone to acquire their land and money.

As Sivakkozhundhu was transferred to Coimbatore from Tirunelveli to investigate Anna Thandavam's client case, The latter had planned to kill him. Anna Thandavam also plans to illegally grab land sold to a village temple by Vasu's late father Rathnaswamy. When the land is formally sold to the temple, an irate Anna Thandavam's orders his henchman to assault Vasu's uncle Ramaswamy, following which Vasu (having reconciled with his family) beats the henchman in retaliation and breaks his hand and also fights Anna Thandavam where he thrashes him in full view of the public.

Assisted by Sivakkozhundhu and Divya, Vasu subdues Anna Thandavam's henchmen Sundaram and thwarts the attempts by Anna Thandavam to destroy his family. Vasu manages to arrest the North Indian killers leading to Anna Thandavam's arrest warrant being issued. However, Anna Thandavam's second wife kills Rajalakshmi during the temple festival with a venomous knife. Vasu, learning of Rajalakshmi's death, rushes to Patna, where Anna Thandavam is hiding and kills Anna Thandavam's friend and contract killer Rai Bahadur, along with his henchman and fights with Anna Thandavam, where Vasu brutally kills him, avenging Rajalakshmi's death and arrives back home to mourn Rajalakshmi's death with his family.

Cast

Production

Development
In December 2013, Vishal stated that he would produce and feature in a film which would be directed by Hari and that the pair would collaborate again after the success of their previous venture, Thaamirabharani (2007). Hari had described the film as a "triangular action story" which starts in Coimbatore and ends in Patna, while revealing Yuvan Shankar Raja had already completed composing the film's songs before production began. The film was officially launched on 28 March 2014, with a press release naming the film's cast and crew. Yuvan Shankar Raja was selected to compose the music for the film, while Priyan and V. T. Vijayan were confirmed to be the cinematographer and the editor of the film respectively. Shruti hassan herself was selected to do the costume designing .

Casting
Early reports in December had suggested that Shruti Haasan would be signed on to play the film's heroine, though she only confirmed her participation in March 2014. Sathyaraj and Soori were added to the cast to play supporting roles, while actress Kausalya was announced to be making a comeback with the film starring alongside a bevy of other supporting actresses. The team approached Rekha to play Vishal's mother in the film, but her unavailability meant that the team later cast Raadhika. Prathap Pothen and Janaki Sabesh were also selected to play the parents of Shruti Haasan's character. Andrea Jeremiah was selected to dance in a special number, a folk song, with Vishal. Sathyaraj sported a bald look for this film thanks to his simultaneous shoot for S. S. Rajamouli's Baahubali (2015) and his role was said to be "very powerful" and also the "suspense element of the film". Bhojpuri actor Awadhesh Mishra was selected to play an international don in the film which marks his debut in Tamil cinema. Actor Vaibhav Reddy was selected for an important role in the film, however, his was not part of the film. The Youth, Arts and Culture Minister of Bihar state Vinay Bihari was selected to play the role of a district collector in the film's climatic portions when he expressed his interest in acting to Hari when he was in Bihar for location scouting. Barath Raj who has won Mr.INDIA second runner up 2014 title has played a crucial role of collector's son from Bihar. Actress Abhinaya was selected to play a supporting role. Mukesh Tiwari plays antagonistic role in the movie.

Filming
Principal photography commenced on 18 April 2014 at Chennai. During the shoot of an action sequence in a one crore worth set at Saligramam, Vishal injured his middle finger in his right hand for which 14 stitches were administered. Thus the shoot was temporarily halted. The item number featuring Vishal and Andrea Jeremiah was shot by early May in the backdrop of the Koyambedu Market in Chennai. Later, the unit proceeded to Coimbatore for filming major portions of the film. At that time, it was known that Hari planned to wrap the film's shoot in 40 working days. A fight sequence was shot in a popular mall multiplex there and scenes involving Vishal and Shruti Hassan were also shot in the mall in Coimbatore. The filming continued at Karaikudi in early July where scenes featuring the principal cast were shot. The shooting continued in hot weather making things difficult while Vishal suffered injuries for the second time in the film's shoot. He suffered a fracture during the shoot of an action sequence after trying to avoid falling on his face while he slipped from an asbestos sheet.

In the first week of August 2014, the film's climax was shot in Patna in a 10-day schedule and by then, 95% of the film's shoot was complete. The climax was said to have few risky stunts which were shot first in the final schedule. Both Vishal and Shruti Hassan carried out the risky stunts and fights by themselves. Some scenes for the climax were also shot in Golconda Fort in Hyderabad in special and enormous sets erected for the climax and a song was also shot there. On its completion, one romantic song was shot at Switzerland and the remaining fast-paced song was shot in Chennai. Vishal and Shruti Haasan completed a hard folk song sequence, which was shot in AVM facilities and choreographed by Baba Baskar. One more song sequence was also shot in Poland. On 29 September 2014, Shruti confirmed that the shooting of the film was completed.

Music

The soundtrack was composed by Yuvan Shankar Raja. The album consists of six tracks and Na. Muthukumar had penned the lyrics for all songs. The track list was released on 29 September 2014, while the audio launch took place on 1 October 2014 at the Loyola-ICAM College of Engineering and Technology. Vishal released the album through his newly launched music label - V Music, a subsidiary of the production house alongside Divo.

The album received mixed reviews from critics. Behindwoods gave 2.5 out of 5 stars and concluded that "Yuvan delivers what is needed for a commercial entertainer". Indiaglitz gave 2.75 out of 5 and wrote that the album was "a commercial cocktail which could have been better", and chose "Devathai", "Soda Bottle" and "Veraarum" as the album's picks.

Release
During the film's launch, Hari stated that the film would release in October 2014 as a Deepavali release. The same was stated again in the end of July 2014.

The Tamil Nadu theatrical distribution rights were acquired by Vendhar Movies.

Stills featuring Vishal and Shruti Hassan were released on 18 April 2014. The official motion poster teaser of the film was released on 1 September 2014. The official teaser of the film released on 11 September 2014. The satellite rights of the film were sold to Sun TV. The film released in over 1100 screens worldwide.

Critical reception
IB Times called it a typical commercial. The Times of India gave the film 3 stars out of 5 and wrote, "Poojai is commercial masala done well. There is action (punchy), sentiment (effective but not affecting), humour (silly but funny once in a while), romance (ludicrous and strictly functional), and the director manages to keep things ticking —the action is often relentless, and the nondescript songs and the comedy scenes (Soori and Pandi doing a pale imitation of Goundamani and Senthil) are breathers for us". The Hindu wrote, "Poojai, despite not being Hari’s best, could still be successful in the B and C centres, and affirm his bankability. The writing is generally not well thought out though. It seems almost like groups of imperfect scenes were put together in the hope that they’d somehow come together to form a riveting, entertaining whole. Poojai then is a refutation of Aristotle’s adage that states that the whole is greater than the sum of its parts". Sify called it "a typical Hari mass entertainer, though this time he has not got the mix in the right proposition". Bangalore Mirror gave 3 stars out of 5 and wrote, "All the formulaic features that usually form part of a Hari film are all intact here as well, the racy screenplay included. But then, the problem is that the theme is too old-fashioned, with a customary villain trying to dominate a particular community and the hero rising in revolt the moment his family gets affected. Neither there is freshness in treatment nor there is novelty in the narration".

Indo-Asian News Service gave 2 stars and wrote, "Gopalakrishnan (Hari) has written Poojai with the mindset that anything that comes from his camp will be lapped up by audiences, no matter how good or bad it is. If you've followed his films over the years, it's easier to predict Poojai from start to finish with eyes closed. Because of which you realise the director never tries to innovate with his films and usually sticks to a template he's done to death". Behindwoods stated "the director takes us through a roller coaster in the first half. But it feels like Hari loses the grip post interval a bit and the film plods in the second half, with misplaced song sequences and repetitive action blocks...Poojai is still a watchable entertainer to spend time on, with your family on a festive day", giving it a rating of 2.25 out of 5. Indiaglitz.com wrote, "Poojai is a mix of a lot of genres, but they seem disproportionate for the times and taste of this day. However, it is an entertaining three hours of festivity, to chill out on. Most importantly, thanks to Hari for a thoroughbred masala movie after a long time in Kollywood". Cinemalead rated 2.25 out of 5 and wrote,"Customary commercial potboiler!"

Box office
Poojai was dubbed into Telugu as Pooja which was simultaneously released with the original version. The first look poster of the Telugu dubbed version titled Pooja was released on 11 August 2014. According to Andhraboxoffice, the Telugu version was commercially successful, delivering Rs. 5.51 crores.

Remake
The film was initially planned to be remade in Kannada as Ayush with Darshan. However, in 2017 officially remade in Kannada as Anjani Putra by A.Harsha with Puneeth Rajkumar and Rashmika Mandanna in the lead.

References

External links
 

2014 films
2014 action films
2010s masala films
Films scored by Yuvan Shankar Raja
Films directed by Hari (director)
2010s Tamil-language films
Tamil films remade in other languages
Indian romantic action films
Films set in Chennai
Films shot in Chennai
Films shot in Poland
Films shot in Bihar
Films shot in Hyderabad, India
Films shot in Coimbatore
Films shot in Switzerland
Films shot in Pollachi